Arthur Douglas Howden Smith (1887–1945) was an American historian and novelist.

Life
Smith was born in New York. In 1907, he joined the Internal Macedonian Revolutionary Organization (VMRO) in Sofia. His experiences he recounted in 1908 in the book Fighting the Turk in the Balkans, describing the revolutionary struggle in Macedonia. On returning to the United States, Smith became a reporter for the newspaper the  New York Evening Post.

Work
Smith began writing by contributing fiction to pulp magazines; his main market was Adventure. Smith also wrote fiction for Blue Book.

For Adventure, Smith wrote sea stories about the adventures of Captain McConaughy. There were also historical swashbucklers about a Viking, Swain, living in Medieval Orkney and engaged in a terrible feud with the witch Frakork and her blood-thirsty grandson Olvir Rosta – which Smith bases on historical information provided by the Orkneyinga saga.

Smith's most famous series were the "Grey Maiden" stories. This revolved around a cursed sword created during the reign of Pharaoh Thutmose III and its subsequent appearances through world history.

Smith also wrote "The Doom Trail" (1921) and its sequel "Beyond the Sunset", the adventures of Harry Ormerod, an 18th-century English exile, in the frontier of Colonial North America at the Iroqois country where a fierce struggle is waged with French agents out of Canada for control of the fur trade.

Smith was a great admirer of Robert Louis Stevenson. In Porto Bello Gold (1924), a prequel to Treasure Island – written with the permission of Robert Louis Stevenson's executor, Lloyd Osbourne – Harry Ormerod's son Robert goes to sea in the company of such famous pirates as Captain Flint, Long John Silver and Billy Bones and takes part in capturing the treasure which would be recovered in Stevenson's book. Smith also wrote a sequel to Stevenson's Kidnapped, Alan Breck Again.

The Ormerod Family saga was continued further in The Manifest Destiny where Robert Ormerod's great-grandson takes part in the expeditions of the 19th century adventurer William Walker.

Smith wrote several books on American history, including a biography of Cornelius Vanderbilt, Commodore Vanderbilt: An Epic of American Achievement (1927).

References

External links

 
 Robert Kenneth Jones, Pulp Classics: The Lure of Adventure (2007)  at Google Books – pp. 35–36, on Smith, "perhaps the most series-minded" Adventure writer

 

1887 births
1945 deaths
20th-century American historians
20th-century American male writers
20th-century American novelists
American fantasy writers
American historical novelists
American male non-fiction writers
American male novelists
American newspaper reporters and correspondents
Pulp fiction writers
Writers of historical fiction set in the early modern period
Writers of historical fiction set in the Middle Ages